The International Max Planck Research School for Molecular Life Sciences (short: IMPRS-LS) is a German centre for postgraduate training and research in life sciences. It is one among over 60 International Max Planck Research Schools in Germany. It is located in Munich and was established in 2005. The Ph.D. program is organised by three of the Max Planck Institutes and two universities in Munich.

International Max Planck Research Schools
To date more than 60 International Max Planck Research Schools (short: IMPRS) have been established in Germany, each representing a joint cooperative of Max Planck Institutes and one or several German universities. The concept for the International Max Planck Research Schools was jointly developed in 1999 by the Max Planck Society and the so-called Hochschul Rektoren Konferenz (HRK), a body representing all German universities. The aim of these PhD programs is to offer German and international doctoral students a first class education in innovative and interdisciplinary research environments with facilities and research projects. Each International Max Planck Research School covers a specific topic in one of the following areas: chemistry, physics & technology, biology & medicine or human sciences. In contrast to traditional doctoral education in Germany where a doctoral student is trained and supervised individually by a professor or group leader, Max Planck Research Schools offer structured programs with a defined curriculum and a supervision by a committee of normally 3 or more expert scientists.  Language of instruction is English. German language courses are provided to interested international students. 
In order to maintain highest educational standards, all IMPRS programs are evaluated on a regular basis by an international and independent scientific commission.

International Max Planck Research School for Molecular Life Sciences (IMPRS-LS)
The International Max Planck Research School for Molecular and Cellular Life Sciences (short: IMPRS-LS) was established in 2005. The research oriented PhD program is jointly organized by the Max Planck Institute of Biochemistry, the Max Planck Institute of Neurobiology and the Max Planck Institute of Psychiatry in cooperation with two of Germany's leading universities, the Ludwig-Maximilians-Universität München and the Technische Universität München. Over 60 research groups from the Munich area participate in the program, covering many aspects of life sciences including biochemistry, cell biology, molecular medicine, neurobiology and structural biology.

IMPRS-LS is 100% committed to basic research and aims to address fundamental questions in the following research areas: 

 Biochemistry
 Biophysics
 Bio-imaging
 Computational Biology
 Gene Regulation
 Immunology
 Neurobiology
 Neurodegeneration
 Protein Structure
 Signaling
 Systems Biology

Although students specialize in a particular research topic, the interdisciplinary context of the program facilitates interactions with other research groups and fosters the ability of cross-frontier thinking. Laboratory work is supplemented by seminars, summer schools, elective courses, training in soft skills and participation in national or international conferences. Currently, some 140 doctoral students are enrolled in IMPRS-LS and approximately 50% of those come from abroad (Germany: 50%, Europe: 30%, Overseas: 20%)

Annually, 30 to 40 doctoral students from all over the world are accepted to the program. Deadline for application is January 6, each year. All doctoral students receive a fellowship covering living expenses and tuition. Entry requirement is a MSc degree (or equivalent) in the fields of biology, biochemistry, bioinformatics, biophysics, biotechnology, medicine or in a related discipline. The doctoral degree is usually awarded by one of the two participating Munich universities. International doctoral students may also obtain their doctoral degree from a university residing in their home country.

Currently, more than 250 doctoral students from all over the world are working at the Max Planck Institutes of Biochemistry and Neurobiology, together with numerous doctoral students from close by university laboratories. Amongst other activities, graduate students organize a regular social get together, a seminar series, and <interact>, an annual student symposium.

See also 

Max Planck Institute of Biochemistry
Max Planck Institute of Neurobiology
Max Planck Institute of Psychiatry
Ludwig-Maximilians-Universität München
Technische Universität München

References

External links
 Homepage of the International Max Planck Research School for Molecular Life Sciences (IMPRS-LS)

Molecular Life Sciences and Cellular Life Sciences
Education in Germany